Pat Barrington (born Patricia Annette Bray, October 16, 1939September 1, 2014) was a dancer and actress who appeared in the films Orgy of the Dead credited as Pat Berringer (1965, dir Stephen C. Apostolof, writer Edward D. Wood, Jr.), The Agony of Love (1966, Harry Novak) and Mondo Topless (1966, directed by Russ Meyer).  She had several husbands, including Robert Caramico, the director of cinematography on Orgy of the Dead; in between she lived with jazz musician Melvin Rees in 1960 when he was arrested for mass murder—and later for serial murder—in West Memphis, AR.  They met in D.C. when she was stripping as Vivian Storm—a job secured for her by a mobster—and lived together there in 1959 before venturing further south. She stripped until the early 1990s, then became a telemarketer, and supported animal rescue groups. Barrington died from lung cancer at age 74 on September 1, 2014.

Selected filmography

References

External links
 

1941 births
2014 deaths
20th-century American actresses
Deaths from lung cancer in Florida
21st-century American women